Bargème is a commune in the Var department in the Provence-Alpes-Côte d'Azur region in southeastern France.

See also
Communes of the Var department

History
In 1949 Evelyn Watts, an English social worker, with a friend set up a home in Bargème for disadvantaged children to recover their strength and confidence in a healthy climate. Her book Castle on a Hill describes the venture.

References

Communes of Var (department)
Plus Beaux Villages de France